Sonego is an Italian surname. Notable people with the surname include:

Carlo Sonego (born 1972), retired Italian javelin thrower
Lorenzo Sonego (born 1995), Italian tennis player
Rodolfo Sonego (1921 – 2000), Italian screenwriter

Italian-language surnames